LGR (originally an initialism of Lazy Game Reviews) is an American YouTube channel and web series created by Clint Basinger (born December 20, 1986) which focuses on video game reviews, retrocomputing, and unboxing videos. His YouTube channel has been compared to that of Techmoan. Basinger is known for restoring a Hot Wheels PC and reviewing expensive vintage computers. The channel is funded through YouTube advertising, and through Patreon.

Output 
His video series include LGR Thrifts, Tech Tales, and Oddware.

For many years, one of the most popular and prominent series on LGR was reviews of games and downloadable content (DLC) from The Sims franchise, beginning with a "Quick Review" of The Sims 3 in 2009. In total, the LGR channel features over a hundred videos on the franchise, mostly involving reviews, but also "LGR Plays" let's-play videos. In 2021, reviews of new DLC for The Sims 4 was halted on the channel, however in August 2022, a review of new DLC for The Sims 4 was released.

References

External links 
 LGR YouTube channel

1986 births
Gaming-related YouTube channels
YouTube channels launched in 2006
Gaming YouTubers
YouTube critics and reviewers
Living people
Entertainers from North Carolina
Technology YouTubers